Dracosciadium is a genus of flowering plants belonging to the family Apiaceae.

Its native range is KwaZulu-Natal.

Species:

Dracosciadium italae 
Dracosciadium saniculifolium

References

Apioideae
Apioideae genera